Glebovo may refer to the following places in Russia:

 Glebovo, Kursky District, Kursk Oblast, a selo
 Glebovo, Medvensky District, Kursk Oblast, a selo
 Glebovo, Vladimir Oblast, a village
 Glebovo, Vologda Oblast, a village

See also
 Glebov